Ernest Macartney de Burgh (18 January 1863 – 3 April 1929) was an Irish-born Australian civil engineer, chief-engineer for water supply and sewerage in New South Wales.

Early life

De Burgh was the youngest son of the Rev. William de Burgh, D.D., and his wife Janette, née Macartney. He was born at Sandymount, County Dublin, Ireland. He was educated at Rathmines school and the Royal College of Science for Ireland, and was for some time employed on railway construction in Ireland.

Engineering in Australia

De Burgh then migrated to Australia, arriving in Melbourne on the Orient 21 March 1885. Travelling to Sydney de Burgh immediately obtained a position in the New South Wales public works department and was engaged on survey work for Sydney's southern outfall sewer. In 1887 he was sent to the countryside in charge of the construction of steel bridges, and eventually became engineer of bridges. He was in this capacity responsible for several bridges over the Murray, Murrumbidgee, Lachlan, Hunter and other rivers. He was also responsible for the Hampden Bridge (see picture) over the Kangaroo River.

In 1903 de Burgh became acting principal assistant engineer of water supply and sewerage, a year later visited Europe to study dam construction and water supply, and after his return did important work in connection with the Burrinjuck Dam and Murrumbidgee irrigation scheme. He was appointed chief-engineer for harbours and water supply in 1909, and in 1913 chief-engineer for water supply and sewerage. He designed and supervised the construction of the great reservoirs for the Sydney water supply at Cataract, Cordeaux, Avon, and Nepean, for the Chichester scheme for Newcastle district, and the Umberumberka scheme at Broken Hill. While he was chief-engineer for harbours, he directed the design of the No1. Jetty at Port Kembla, a coal jetty and ship-loader of an advanced design for its time.

Later life and legacy
De Burgh was a member of the Institution of Civil Engineers, London, and was twice winner of the Telford premium. De Burghs Bridge over the Lane Cove River, Sydney, is named after him.  The De Burgh Dam near the Burrinjuck Dam was also named after him.  The dam is considered to be the first reinforced-concrete thin arch dam in Australia.

He married Constance Mary, née Yeo, on 20 March 1888 who survived him along with two sons and a daughter. (Thomas de Burgh also an engineer with MWS&DB)

De Burgh timbertruss 

Ernest De Burgh's bridges were the fourth type of timber truss bridge in a series of five used. These included 1865 Old PWD, 1884 McDonald, 1894 Allan, 1899 de Burgh and 1905 Dare. Each was a technical improvement on its predecessor.

Gallery

References

Bibliography and Further reading

1863 births
1929 deaths
19th-century Irish people
Australian people of Irish descent
Australian civil engineers
Engineers from Dublin (city)
20th-century deaths from tuberculosis
Tuberculosis deaths in Australia
People from Sandymount
Australian people of Anglo-Irish descent
Infectious disease deaths in New South Wales